Sunni Islam is the dominant religion in Jordan. Muslims make up about 98% of the country's population. A few of them are Shiites. Many Shia in Jordan are refugees from Syria, Lebanon, and Iraq.

The country also boasts one of the oldest Christian communities in the world, coexisting with the rest of the population. They made up about 4.2% of the population when the country had 5 million inhabitants in 2005. down from 20% in the 1930s, due to several reasons, mainly due to high rates of Muslim immigration into the country. More than half are Greek Orthodox. The rest are Latin or Greek Rite Catholics, Syrian Orthodox, Protestants and Armenians., ibid. Jordanian Christians in a country of almost 10 million are thought to number 250,000–400,000 excluding tens of thousands of Syrian and Iraqi Christians in the country. A 2015 study estimates some 6,500 Christian believers, from a Muslim background, are in the country, most of them belonging to some form of Protestantism.

There are around 20,000 to 32,000 Druze living mostly in the north of Jordan, while there are fewer than 800 Jordanian of the Baháʼí Faith, mainly living in Addassia village near the Jordan Valley.

There are no legal restrictions on Jews, but in 2006, there were reported to be no Jewish citizens. Baháʼís and other non-recognised religious minorities face several restrictions.

Distribution
The percentages vary slightly in different cities and regions, for instance the south of Jordan and cities like Zarqa have the highest percentage of Muslims, while Amman, Irbid, Madaba, Salt, and Karak have larger Christian communities than the national average, and the towns of Fuheis, Al Husn and Ajloun have either majority Christian or much greater than national average. Several villages have mixed Christian/Muslim populations, like Kufranja and Raimoun in the north.

Anglicans/Episcopalians in Jordan are under the oversight of the Anglican Bishop in Jerusalem. The Church of the Redeemer is the largest congregation by membership of any church in the entire Episcopal Diocese of Jerusalem. Other Episcopal churches are in Ashrafiyya, Salt, Zarqa, Marka refugee camp, Irbid, Al Husn and Aqaba.

Social life
In general, Muslims and Christians live together with no major problems regarding differences and discrimination. However, the smallest minorities, consisting of small Shia, Druze and Baháʼí Faith contingents, experience the greatest degree of religious discrimination from the government. Examples include instances of rejection by the Jordanian government to recognize members of the Baháʼí Faith and the Anglican Church.

Religious freedom

The state religion is Islam, but the constitution provides for the freedom to practice one's religion in accordance with the customs that are observed in the Kingdom, unless they violate public order or morality.

Some issues, however, such as religious conversion, are controversial. Although conversion to Islam is relatively free of legal complications, those wishing to leave Islam are not recognised as such and are still considered legally Muslims and face immense societal pressure. Among the restrictions against religious minorities are:

 Jordan's government may deny recognition to a religion.
 Baháʼís are not permitted to establish schools, places of worship or cemeteries.
 Aside from Christians, all other non-Muslim minorities do not have their own courts to adjudicate personal status and family matters.
 Muslim women may not marry non-Muslim men, such as Christians, unless the men legally convert to Islam.
 Since Muslims are prohibited from converting to other religions according to the Sharia law, converts from Islam cannot change their religion on governmental records. However, converts to Islam are required to change their religious identification to "Muslim" on governmental records and civil documents.

In June 2006, the government published the International Covenant on Civil and Political Rights in the government's Official Gazette. Article 18 of that Covenant provides freedom of religion.

See also

 Demographics of Jordan
 Jordanian Interfaith Coexistence Research Center

References